Doolan (Irish: Ó Duibhleachain) is a surname of Irish origin. They were chiefs of the Clan Breasail Mac Duileachain in the Ulaid sub-kingdom of Dál Fiatach, specifically located in what became the barony of Castlereagh.

Notable people
 Alex Doolan (born 1985), Australian cricketer
 Ben Doolan (born 1973), former Australian rules footballer
 Billy Doolan (born 1952), Australian Indigenous artist
 Bruce Doolan (born 1947), Australian former cricketer
 Daithí Doolan (born 1968), Irish Sinn Féin politician
 Ed Doolan (1941–2018), Australian-born naturalised British radio presenter
 Jack Doolan (American football) (1919-2002), American National Football League running back
 Jack Doolan (politician) (1927-1995), Australian politician
 John Doolan (footballer born 1968), former Wigan Athletic footballer
 John Doolan (footballer born 1974), former Mansfield Town and Barnet footballer
 Ken Doolan (born 1939), Australian rear admiral
 Kevin Doolan (born 1980), Australian motorcycle speedway rider
 Kris Doolan (born 1986), Scottish footballer
 Mickey Doolan (1880-1951), American Major League Baseball player
 Neil Doolan (1933–2012), former Australian rules footballer
 Peter Doolan (born 1940), Irish former hurler
 Vin Doolan (born 1952), former Australian rules footballer
 Wendy Doolan (born 1968), Australian former golfer

See also
 Dolan (disambiguation)
 Doolin (surname)
 Doolin (Irish: Dúlainn), a coastal village in County Clare, Ireland

References

Surnames of Irish origin
Irish royal families
Anglicised Irish-language surnames